What It Is is an album by American jazz pianist Mal Waldron recorded in 1981 and released by the Enja label.

Reception
The Allmusic review by Ron Wynn awarded the album 3 stars stating "dauntless piano".

Track listing
All compositions by Mal Waldron except as indicated
 "Charlie Parker's Last Supper" (Clifford Jordan) — 7:14 
 "Hymn from the Inferno" — 12:02 
 "What It Is" — 17:58 
Recorded at Vanguard Studios in New York City on November 15, 1981

Personnel
 Mal Waldron — piano 
 Clifford Jordan — tenor saxophone
 Cecil McBee — bass
 Dannie Richmond — drums

References

Enja Records albums
Mal Waldron albums
1981 albums